Doubleday is an American publishing company. It was founded as the Doubleday & McClure Company in 1897 and was the largest in the United States by 1947. It published the work of mostly U.S. authors under a number of imprints and distributed them through its own stores. In 2009 Doubleday merged with Knopf Publishing Group to form the Knopf Doubleday Publishing Group, which is now part of Penguin Random House. In 2019, the official website presents Doubleday as an imprint, not a publisher.

History
The firm was founded as Doubleday & McClure Company in 1897 by Frank Nelson Doubleday in partnership with Samuel Sidney McClure. McClure had founded the first U.S. newspaper syndicate in 1884 (McClure Syndicate) and the monthly McClure's Magazine in 1893. One of their first bestsellers was The Day's Work by Rudyard Kipling, a short story collection that Macmillan published in Britain late in 1898. Other authors published by the company in its early years include W. Somerset Maugham and Joseph Conrad. Theodore Roosevelt, Jr. later served as a vice-president of the company.

The partnership ended in 1900. McClure and John Sanborn Phillips, the co-founder of his magazine, formed McClure, Phillips and Company. Doubleday and Walter Hines Page formed Doubleday, Page & Company.

The racist but bestselling novels of Thomas Dixon Jr. (The Leopard's Spots, 1902; The Clansman, 1905) "changed a struggling publishing venture into the empire that Doubleday was to become". At the same time, Doubleday helped Dixon launch his writing career. Page and Dixon were both from North Carolina and had known each other in Raleigh.

In 1910, Doubleday, Page & Co. moved its operations, which included a train station, to Garden City. The company purchased much of the land on the east side of Franklin Avenue, and estate homes were built for many of its executives on Fourth Street. Co-founder and Garden City resident Walter Hines Page was named Ambassador to Great Britain in 1916. In 1922 the company founded its juvenile department, the second in the nation, with May Massee as head. The founder's son Nelson Doubleday joined the firm in the same year.

In 1927, Doubleday, Page merged with the George H. Doran Company, creating Doubleday, Doran, then the largest publishing business in the English-speaking world. Doubleday Canada Limited launches in the thirties. In 1944, Doubleday, Doran acquired the Philadelphia medical publisher Blakiston. In 1946, the company became Doubleday and Company. Nelson Doubleday resigned as president, but continued as chairman of the board until his death on January 11, 1949. Douglas Black took over as president from 1946 to 1963. His tenure attracted numerous public figures to the publishing company, including Dwight D. Eisenhower, Harry S. Truman, Douglas MacArthur, Robert Taft, and André Malraux. He was a strong opponent of censorship and felt that it was his responsibility to the American public to publish controversial titles. Black also expanded Doubleday's publishing program by opening two new printing plants; creating a new line of quality paperbacks, under the imprint Anchor Books; attracting new book clubs to its book club division; opening 30 new retail stores in 25 cities; and opening new editorial offices in San Francisco, London, and Paris.

By 1947, Doubleday was the largest publisher in the US, with annual sales of over 30 million books. In 1954, Doubleday sold Blakiston to McGraw-Hill.

Doubleday's son-in-law John Sargent was president and CEO from 1963 to 1978. In 1964, Doubleday acquired the educational publisher Laidlaw.

In 1967 the company purchased the Dallas-based Trigg-Vaughn group of radio and TV stations to create Doubleday Broadcasting. After expanding during the 1970s and 1980s, Doubleday sold the broadcasting division in 1986.

Nelson Doubleday, Jr. succeeded John Sargent as president and CEO from 1978 to 1985. In 1976, Doubleday bought paperback publisher Dell Publishing. In 1980, the company bought the New York Mets baseball team. The Mets defeated the Boston Red Sox to win the World Series in 1986 in a 7-game contest. In 1981, Doubleday promoted James R. McLaughlin to the presidency of Dell Publishing.

Sales slowed in the early eighties and earnings fell precipitously. Doubleday, Jr., brought James McLaughlin over (from subsidiary Dell) to help streamline and downsize. McLaughlin went on to succeed Doubleday, Jr., as president and CEO, with Doubleday, Jr., becoming chairman of the board.

By 1986 the firm was a fully integrated international communications company, doing trade publishing, mass-market paperback publishing, book clubs, and book manufacturing, together with ventures in broadcasting and advertising. The company had offices in London and Paris and wholly owned subsidiaries in Canada, Australia, and New Zealand, with joint ventures in the UK and the Netherlands. Nelson Doubleday, Jr. sold the publishing company to Bertelsmann in 1986 for a reported $475 million, with James R. McLaughlin resigning on December 17, 1986. After the purchase, Bertelsmann sold Laidlaw to Macmillan Inc.

The sale of Doubleday to Bertelsmann did not include the Mets, which Nelson Doubleday and minority owner Fred Wilpon had purchased from Doubleday & Company for $85 million. In 2002, Doubleday sold his stake in the Mets to Wilpon for $135 million after a feud over the monetary value of the team. 

In 1988, portions of the firm became part of the Bantam Doubleday Dell Publishing Group, which in turn became a division of Random House in 1998. Doubleday was combined in a group with Broadway Books, Anchor Books was combined with Vintage Books as a division of Knopf, while Bantam and Dell became a separate group.

In 1996, Doubleday founded the Christian publisher WaterBrook Press. WaterBrook acquired Harold Shaw Publishers in 2000 and Multnomah Publishers in 2006.

In late 2008 and early 2009, the Doubleday imprint merged with Knopf Publishing Group to form the Knopf Doubleday Publishing Group. In October 2008, Doubleday laid off about 10% of its staff (16 people) across all departments. The Broadway, Doubleday Business, Doubleday Religion, and WaterBrook Multnomah divisions were moved to Crown Publishing Group.

Presidents
Frank Doubleday, founder, 1897–1922
Nelson Doubleday, 1922–1946
Douglas Black, 1946–1963
John Turner Sargent, Sr., 1963–1978
Nelson Doubleday, Jr., 1978–1983
James R. McLaughlin, 1983–1986

Notable editors
Jacqueline Kennedy Onassis (associate editor 1978–1982, senior editor 1982–1994)
T. O'Conor Sloane III (senior editor 1960–1977)
May Massee (head of juvenile 1922–1932)

Notable authors

 Chinua Achebe
 Andre Agassi
 Felipe Alfau
 Isaac Asimov
 Margaret Atwood
 John Barth
 Evelyn Berckman
 Ray Bradbury
 Dan Brown
 Bill Bryson
 Pat Conroy
 Philip K. Dick
 Theodore Dreiser
 Daphne du Maurier
 Raymond E. Feist
 Graeme Gibson
 Erving Goffman
 John Grisham
 Mark Haddon
 Arthur Hailey
 Alex Haley
 Noah Hawley
 Dolores Hitchens
 Laura Z. Hobson
 Lilly Singh
 Michael Jackson
 Carl Jung
 Michio Kaku
 Stephen King
 Rudyard Kipling
 Jon Krakauer
 Jonathan Lethem
 Alistair MacLean
 Peter Mayle
 Andy McNab
 Herman Melville
 Michael A. O'Donnell
 Kirby Page
 Chuck Palahniuk
 Vera Pavlova
 Terry Pratchett
 Christopher Reich
 Judith Rossner
 Bill Strickland
 Paul Shaffer
 Una Lucy Silberrad
 Wallace Stegner
 Immanuel Velikovsky
 Jose Antonio Villarreal
 Colson Whitehead
 Jacqueline Wilson
 P. G. Wodehouse
 William H. Whyte
 Hanya Yanagihara

Notable employees
 William Faulkner worked part-time at the Doubleday Bookstore in New York City in 1921.

Imprints
The following are imprints that exist or have existed under Doubleday:
 Anchor Books, produced quality paperbacks for bookstores; named for the anchor that (along with a dolphin) forms Doubleday's colophon; now part of the Knopf Publishing Group's Vintage Anchor unit
 Best in Children's Books, a mail-order collection of original children's short story anthologies
 Blakiston Co., medical and scientific books. Sold in 1947 to McGraw-Hill
 Blue Ribbon Books, purchased in 1939 from Reynal & Hitchcock
 Book League of America, contemporary and world classic literature, purchased in 1936
 The Crime Club, active through much of the 20th century, publishing mystery and detective novels, most notably the Fu Manchu series by Sax Rohmer and the Saint series by Leslie Charteris
 Garden City Publishing Co., originally established as a separate firm by Nelson Doubleday, Garden City's books were primarily reprints of books first offered by Doubleday, printed from the original plates but on less expensive paper. It was named for the village of the same name on Long Island in which Doubleday was long headquartered (until 1986), and which still houses Bookspan, the direct marketer of general interest and specialty book clubs run by Doubleday Direct and Book of the Month Club holdings.
 Image Books, Catholic Books, moved to Crown Publishing Group
 Nan A. Talese/Doubleday, a literary imprint established in 1990. Talese, the imprint's publisher and editorial director, is a senior vice president of Doubleday.
 Permabooks, paperback division established in 1948
 Rimington & Hooper, high-quality limited editions
 Triangle Books, purchased in 1939 from Reynal & Hitchcock; sold inexpensive books through chain stores
 Zenith Books, aimed at African-American youths

Bookstores 
Doubleday Bookstores were purchased by Barnes & Noble in 1990 and operated by B. Dalton.

See also 
 A. L. Burt

References

External links 

  – Doubleday imprint at KnopfDoubleday.com
 Records of the publishing firm Doubleday and Company, Inc., selected for preservation by Ken McCormick, at Library of Congress
Collection of Doubleday and Co. drafts, proofs, and other material re At Ease: Stories I Tell to Friends, and The White House Years by Dwight D. Eisenhower, Dwight D. Eisenhower Presidential Library

Book publishing companies based in New York (state)
Publishing companies based in New York City
Doubleday family
New York Mets owners
Random House
Publishing companies established in 1897
1897 establishments in New York (state)